Shawn Van Daele is an artist, photographer, and founder of the Drawing Hope Project. From Eden Mills, Ontario, Van Daele has traveled across Canada and the United States to support sick children. His stated goals include bringing attention to sicknesses children have, and emphasizing organ donation.

References

Canadian photographers
Living people
Year of birth missing (living people)